Joseph Kirkland (January 7, 1830 - April 29, 1894) was an American  novelist. Born in Geneva, New York, to educator William Kirkland and author Caroline Kirkland, he was a businessman in Chicago, then served in the Union Army during the Civil War, reaching the rank of major. He resigned his Union Army commission and moved to Tilton, Illinois, where he married Theodosia B. Wilkinson in 1863. In 1864 he founded the Midwestern literary periodical Prairie Chicken. After the war he became a lawyer while also pursuing writing. He is best remembered as the author of two realistic novels of pioneer life in the Far West, Zury: The Meanest Man in Spring County (1887) and The McVeys. Other works are The Captain of Company K and The Story of Chicago. He was also the literary editor of the Chicago Tribune. Kirkland died in Chicago at the age of 64.

References

External links
 
Joseph Kirkland - bibliographical overview, links to works online
 Joseph Kirkland Papers at the Newberry Library

1830 births
1894 deaths
19th-century American novelists
Chicago Tribune people
People from Geneva, New York
Writers from Chicago
Union Army officers
19th-century American journalists
American male journalists
American male novelists
19th-century American male writers
Journalists from New York (state)
People from Vermilion County, Illinois
Novelists from New York (state)
Novelists from Illinois
Military personnel from Illinois